Moustafa Ahmed Shebto (born Patrick Cheboto on July 4, 1986 in Kaproron, Uganda) is a long distance runner now representing Qatar. Shebto was recruited along with other African runners.

His special distance is 3000 metres steeplechase, a distance in which he competed at the 2005 World Championships.

References

1986 births
Living people
Qatari male steeplechase runners
Ugandan male long-distance runners
Qatari male long-distance runners
World Athletics Championships athletes for Qatar
Ugandan emigrants to Qatar